Sir Thomas Richard Fraser  (5 February 1841 – 4 January 1920) was a British physician and pharmacologist. Together with Alexander Crum Brown he discovered the relationship between physiological activity and chemical constitution of the body.

Life
He was born in Calcutta in India on 5 February 1841, the second son of Mary Palmer and John Richard Fraser, Indian civil servant.

Fraser attended the University of Edinburgh Medical School and graduated with an MD and gold medal in 1862. His award-winning thesis was based on the positive medical applications of physostigmine. This had been discovered by Sir Robert Christison in 1846 but its suggested uses were largely as a humane killing mechanism rather than as a medical tool.

In 1869, Fraser was a medical assistant professor at the Edinburgh Royal Infirmary. In 1877, he was a member of an Arctic expedition and later in 1877 was appointed professor of medicine at the University of Edinburgh, serving until 1918. In 1880 he was nominated Dean of the Medical Faculty.

In his later life he was both a consultant of insurance companies and of the Prisons Commission.

In 1867, he was elected a Fellow of the Royal Society of Edinburgh. His proposer was Sir Robert Christison. He served as the Society's Vice President from 1911 to 1916. He won the Society's Keith Prize for 1891-3 and its Makdougall-Brisbane Prize 1866-8. In 1877, he also was elected a Fellow of the Royal Society. In 1879 he was elected a member of the Aesculapian Club

In 1889 and 1890 he reported about an arrow poison used in coastal areas of Kenya and Nigeria and analysed the highly poisonous Calabar bean and Strophanthus hispidus. In 1897, he was awarded the Cameron Prize for Therapeutics of the University of Edinburgh. From 1898 to 1899 he was president of the Government Commission for the research on the plague in India. He served as President of the Royal College of Physicians of Edinburgh from 1900 to 1902. He was knighted in the 1902 Coronation Honours for his work on the Indian Plague Commission, receiving the accolade from King Edward VII at Buckingham Palace on 24 October 1902. In 1908 he was elected President of the Association of Physicians of Great Britain and Ireland.

He received honorary doctorates from the universities of Aberdeen (LLD), Glasgow (LLD), Edinburgh (LLD), Cambridge (DSc) and Dublin (MD).

In later years he lived at 13 Drumsheugh Gardens in Edinburgh's West End.

He died in Edinburgh on 4 January 1920. He is buried in Dean Cemetery in western Edinburgh, not far from his home. The grave lies in the south-west of the first northern extension, on the wall backing onto the original cemetery.

Family
With his wife Susanna Margaret Duncan Fraser (1850–1929) they had three daughters and eight sons:

 Thomas, was given the middle name Christison in honour of the discoverer of Physostygmine
 Mary Susanna Fraser (1877–1956)
 George Moir Fraser (1878–1932)
 Gertrude Agnes Fraser (b. 1882)
 John Duncan Fraser, died in infancy in 1882
 Lieutenant Commander William St John Fraser (1883–1915), was commander of the submarine E 10 when it was destroyed by enemy action in the North Sea near Heligoland with the loss of all hands
 Sir Francis Richard Fraser (1885–1964), also became a Professor of Materia Medica in Edinburgh
 Henry Chapman Fraser (1887–1916)
 Caroline Annie Fraser (1889–1966)
 Frederick Palmer Fraser (1891–1907) died young
 Eric Malcolm Fraser (1896–1960) who in 1943 was appointed Director-General of Aircraft Production in the Ministry of Aircraft Production

Artistic recognition
His sketch portrait of 1884, by William Brassey Hole, is held by the Scottish National Portrait Gallery.

Publications 
 The antagonism between the actions of active substances; British Medical journal, 1872
 On The Physiological Action Of The Calabar Bean, Physostigma Venenosum Balf.; Transactions of the Royal Society of Edinburgh, XXIV, 1867
 On the connexion between chemical constitution and physiological action; ibidem XXV
 On Stropanthus hispidus; ibidem XXXV
 An investigation into some previously undescribed tetanic symptoms produced by atropia in cold-blooded animals
 ''Strophanthus hispidus: its Natural History, Chemistry and Pharmacology. Transactions of the Royal Society of Edinburgh, Vol. XXXV, 955–1028

References

External links

 

1841 births
1920 deaths
19th-century English medical doctors
Academics of the University of Edinburgh
Alumni of the University of Edinburgh
Fellows of the Royal Society
Knights Bachelor
Presidents of the Royal College of Physicians of Edinburgh
Medical doctors from Edinburgh